is a Japanese professional golfer.

Fujiki was born in Mie. He won 14 tournaments on the Japan Golf Tour. In his only major appearance, he finished 59th at the 1984 Open Championship.

Professional wins (14)

Japan Golf Tour wins (14)

*Note: The 1990 Yomiuri Sapporo Beer Open was shortened to 54 holes due to weather.

Japan Golf Tour playoff record (3–6)

Team appearances
World Cup (representing Japan): 1983
Four Tours World Championship (representing Japan): 1990

See also
List of golfers with most Japan Golf Tour wins

External links

Japanese male golfers
Japan Golf Tour golfers
Sportspeople from Mie Prefecture
1955 births
Living people